Ni Hong, may refer to:

Ni Hong (fencer), Chinese fencer
Ni Hong (politician), Chinese politician and the current Minister of Housing and Urban-Rural Development.

See also
Hong ni, a type of red clay